The Oude IJssel (Dutch, literally old IJssel) or Issel (German) is a river in Germany and the Netherlands approximately  long. It is a right tributary of the river IJssel. Oude IJssel is Dutch for "Old IJssel"; the Oude IJssel was the upper course of the IJssel until the connection with the Rhine was dug, possibly in the Roman era.

This connection made the Rhine the largest contributor to the flow of the IJssel, although only a relatively small amount of the total flow of the Rhine made its way into the system. Various tributaries can sometimes add water to the total flow of the river, for example the Berkel and the Schipbeek. The IJssel river is the only branch of the Rhine delta that consumes tributary rivers instead of giving birth to distributary rivers. The latter only happens at the last part of the river, where the small IJssel Delta is created.

The Oude IJssel begins near Borken in North Rhine-Westphalia, Germany. It flows southwest until it nearly reaches the Rhine near Wesel, then it turns northwest. After Isselburg it crosses the border with the Netherlands and enters the province of Gelderland. It flows through Doetinchem and joins the IJssel in Doesburg.

References

Rivers of North Rhine-Westphalia
Achterhoek
Rivers of Gelderland
Rivers of the Netherlands
Rivers of Germany
International rivers of Europe